Warrington South is a constituency represented in the House of Commons of the UK Parliament since 2019 by Andy Carter, a Conservative Party politician.

Constituency profile 
Warrington South is one of two seats covering the Borough of Warrington, the other being Warrington North. The seat covers the parts of the town lying south of the River Mersey, including Appleton, Grappenhall and Stockton Heath, the town centre and the Penketh and Sankey areas in the west of the town. It also includes the village of Lymm.

Warrington is a historic and industrious town which grew significantly in economy and in population in the 20th century.  Workless claimants who were registered jobseekers, were in November 2012 lower than the national average of 3.8%, at 3.3% of the population based on a statistical compilation by The Guardian.  This contrasted with Warrington North at 4.3% of its population.

Creation 
The constituency was created for the 1983 general election following the major reorganisation of local authorities under the Local Government Act 1972, which came into effect on 1 April 1974. It comprised parts of the abolished constituencies of Newton, Runcorn and Warrington.

Boundaries 	

1983–1997: The Borough of Warrington wards of Appleton and Stretton, Booths Hill, Grappenhall and Thelwall, Great Sankey North, Great Sankey South, Heatley, Latchford, Lymm, Penketh and Cuerdley, Statham, Stockton Heath, and Walton and Westy, and the Borough of Halton wards of Daresbury and Norton.

Areas to the south of the Manchester Ship Canal, now part of the newly formed Borough of Warrington (including Lymm) and the Borough of Halton wards were previously part of Runcorn constituency. Great Sankey and Penketh, to the west of the town, were previously part of Newton. Also included a small part of the abolished Warrington constituency.

1997–2010: The Borough of Warrington wards of Appleton, Stretton and Hatton, Grappenhall and Thelwall, Great Sankey North, Great Sankey South, Howley and Whitecross, Latchford, Lymm, Penketh and Cuerdley, Stockton Heath, and Walton and Westy.

Under the Fourth Periodic Review of constituencies, the number of constituencies in Cheshire was increased from 10 to 11 and the Borough of Halton wards were now included in the newly created constituency of Weaver Vale. To compensate for this loss, the town centre area was transferred from Warrington North.

2010–present: The Borough of Warrington wards of Appleton, Bewsey and Whitecross, Grappenhall and Thelwall, Great Sankey North, Great Sankey South, Hatton, Stretton and Walton, Latchford East, Latchford West, Lymm, Penketh and Cuerdley, Stockton Heath, and Whittle Hall.

The current boundaries were introduced at the 2010 general election, following the Fifth Periodic Review. Minor changes due to revision of ward boundaries.

Political history
In 1983, the seat was won for the Conservatives by Mark Carlisle, who before the seat's creation had represented Runcorn. Carlisle served as Secretary of State for Education during part of the Thatcher ministry.

The seat has been relative to others a marginal seat since 2001 as well as a swing seat as its winner's majority has not exceeded 7.5% of the vote since the 16.3% majority won in that year. The seat has changed hands three times since that year.

Warrington South is considered the more volatile of the two Warrington seats.  While Warrington North is a safe seat for the Labour Party, Warrington South is often a bellwether and is regarded as a marginal constituency; it has been won by the largest party in each Parliament at every election with the exception of 1992, when it was taken by Labour's Mike Hall with a majority of just 0.3%, and again in 2017.  Hall moved to the new Weaver Vale seat in 1997, but the seat was retained for the Labour party by Helen Southworth who represented the seat until her retirement at the 2010 election and successor candidate's defeat.

2010 election
On 15 June 2009, Helen Southworth announced her intention to retire the next year.  Largely because of its close result in 2005, the seat was considered to be one of the key seats which the Conservative Party would have to win to become the largest party in Parliament. The BBC ranked Warrington South as the 85th most marginal seat. The new boundaries were considered to be slightly more favourable to the Labour Party according to an academic, non-partisan election analysis.

The Liberal Democrats had also identified Warrington South as a target seat.  On election day the Liberal Democrat party held 22 of the 30 Borough Council seats in the wards which made up the constituency. The importance of the Warrington South seat was underlined when Nick Clegg, the Liberal Democrat party leader, chose to visit the constituency the morning after the first of the televised "leaders' debates", which he had been widely perceived as having won.

While all three parties made strenuous efforts to win the seat, it was the Conservative candidate David Mowat who was elected, although fewer than 5,000 votes separated all three parties.

Subsequent elections 
In 2015 and 2017, the seat was considered an important Labour-Conservative marginal, the Liberal Democrats losing substantial ground here in both elections. The 2015 election saw Mowat re-elected with an increased majority; in 2017, it was regained by Labour's Faisal Rashid on a 4.4% swing. It was retaken for the Conservatives in 2019 by Andy Carter. In all three cases, the victory margin between first and second was smaller than overall vote of the third-placed Liberal Democrats, although the latter were a long way behind the top two parties.

Members of Parliament

Elections

Elections in the 2010s

Elections in the 2000s

Elections in the 1990s

Elections in the 1980s

See also

 List of parliamentary constituencies in Cheshire
History of parliamentary constituencies and boundaries in Cheshire

Notes

References

Parliamentary constituencies in Cheshire
Constituencies of the Parliament of the United Kingdom established in 1983
Politics of Warrington